Altium Limited is an Australian multinational software company that provides electronic design automation software to engineers who design printed circuit boards. Founded as Protel Systems Pty Ltd in Australia in 1985, the company has regional  headquarters in the United States, Australia, China, Europe, and Japan. Its products are designed for use in a Microsoft Windows environment and used in industries such as automotive, aerospace, defense, and telecommunications. Its flagship product, Altium Designer, is a software for unified electronics design.

History

Early history 
The history of Altium dates to 1985 with the founding of Protel Systems Pty Ltd by electronics designer Nicholas Martin. He was working at the University of Tasmania in the 1980s. He saw an opportunity to make the design of electronics product affordable, by marrying the techniques of electronics design to the PC platform. The company launched its first product in 1985, a DOS-based printed circuit board (PCB) layout and design tool. Protel PCB was marketed internationally by HST Technology Pty Ltd. since 1986.

In October 1986 the San Diego-based ACCEL Technologies, Inc. acquired marketing and support responsibilities of the PCB program for the US, Canada and Mexico under the name Tango PCB. In 1987, Protel launched the circuit diagram editor Protel Schematic for DOS. This was followed by Autotrax and Easytrax in 1988.

In the 1990s, the company began developing a unified electronics design system, which uses a single data model to hold all of the design data required to create a product. FPGA, PCB and embedded software development processes were unified with a common project view and data model. A variety of editing tools could then be used to access and manipulate the design, covering areas such as board layout and design, schematic capture, routing (EDA), testing, analysis and FPGA design.

In 1991, Protel released Advanced Schematic/PCB 1.0 for Windows, the world's first Windows-based PCB design system. It also began acquisition of various companies with the technologies needed to create a unified electronics design solution, including Accolade Design Automation in 1998.

1999-2010; IPO and name change to Altium 
In August 1999, Altium went public on the Australian Securities Exchange under symbol (ASX:ALU). The company continued to develop and release new versions of this design tool, including Protel 98 in 1998, Protel 99 in 1999 and Protel 99 SE in 2000. In 2000, Altium acquired ACCEL with whom they previously partnered with in 1986.

In 2001, the company changed its name from Protel Systems to Altium and continued to expand throughout the United States, Europe, and Asia. It also made more acquisitions including embedded software developer Tasking in 2001 for A$73.4 million and EDA software distributor Hoschar AG in 2002.

Protel DXP was issued in 2003, Protel 2004 in 2004, Altium Designer 6.0 in 2005. In 2010, Altium acquired Morfik Technology Pty Ltd., a developer of visual design tools for engineering and deploying cloud-based software applications. Morfik's founders originally worked for Altium/Protel before leaving to found the company after Altium's IPO.

2011-present; Expansion and acquisitions 
In 2011, Altium announced it would be expanding its presence in Shanghai, China in the second half of 2011 to take advantage of lower wages.

On October 15, 2012, the Altium board removed Nick Martin as CEO and named executive vice chairman Kayvan Oboudiyat to replace him. On January 16, 2014, Altium announced Kayvan Oboudiyat's retirement and succession by Aram Mirkazemi as CEO. In May of the same year, Altium announced that the core R&D operations for its flagship PCB CAD tools would again relocate in a "cost neutral" move to San Diego, California.

In 2015, Altium acquired Octopart, a search engine for electronic and industrial parts. The same year, it acquired the cloud-based electronic component management system company Ciiva. Additional acquisitions by the company have included enterprise PLM integration solutions provider Perception Software in 2016 and cloud-based EDA tool company Upverter in 2017.

On 7 June 2021, it was revealed that Altium rejected a bid from Autodesk valuing the company at $5.05 billion AUD.

Products 
Altium develops software that is used for designing of electronic products including printed circuit board. Its products are designed for use in a Microsoft Windows environment and used in industries such as automotive, aerospace, defense, and telecommunications.

Altium Designer

Altium Designer is a PCB and electronic design automation software package for printed circuit boards. It allows engineers to design and customize their own circuit boards. Altium Designer is considered the flagship software of the company.

Autotrax / Easytrax

Autotrax is the original Protel PCB design software used for DOS, released in the 1980s.

CircuitMaker

CircuitMaker is electronic design automation software for printed circuit board designs targeted at the hobby, hacker, and maker community. CircuitMaker is available as freeware, and the hardware designed with it may be used for commercial and non-commercial purposes without limitations. The first non-beta version was released on January 17, 2016.

Other products
 Altium 365 - electronics product design platform that unites PCB design, MCAD, data management, and teamwork.
 Altium Concord Pro – Available as part of Altium enterprise solutions. Single source for component data, real-time sourcing information, component traceability within designs, and collaboration tool.
 Altium NEXUS –  Available as part of Altium enterprise solutions. Team-based PCB workflow solution designed to provide the transparency.
 AltiumLive – the cloud-based community that connects Altium designers, collaborators, suppliers, manufacturers and customers.
 Altium Vault – Formal release, re-use and design data management server software.
 CircuitStudio – PCB design software tool
 NanoBoard – reconfigurable hardware development platform.
 P-CAD - Obtained through AccelEDA acquisition, retired in 2006.
 PDN Analyzer - analyze Power Distribution Network (PDN) voltage and current performance 
 TASKING – An embedded systems software development tool.

See also 
List of EDA companies
Electronics
Electronic engineering
FPGAs
Embedded systems
Printed circuit board (PCB)
List of companies of Australia

References

Further reading 
Buetow, Mike (2017-05-25). "The Makers March". Circuit Assembly. Retrieved 2017-05-26. 
Rako, Paul (2017-03-30). "Altium CircuitStudio review: The glory". EDN Network. Retrieved 2017-04-03. 
Drysdale, Chelsey (2015-11-12). "Altium Releases Designer 16 PCB Design Tool". Printed Circuit Design & Fab. Retrieved 2017-04-03.

Companies established in 1985
Companies listed on the Australian Securities Exchange
Electronic design automation software
Companies based in Sydney
La Jolla, San Diego
Companies based in California
Software companies of the United States
1985 establishments in Australia